Bourton Rovers Football Club is a football club based in Bourton-on-the-Water, Gloucestershire, England. Affiliated to the Gloucestershire County Football Association, The club are currently members of the Hellenic Football League and play at Rissington Road. Their nickname is the Rovers.

History
The club was established in 1894. The club played in the local leagues in the area playing in the Cheltenham Football League, then moving up to the Gloucestershire Northern Senior League before moving to the Witney and District League. After finishing runners-up in the Witney and District Premier division at the end of the 2015-16 season, the club moved to the Hellenic Football League for the 2016-17 season. The club won Division 2 west in its first season, but were denied promotion as their ground was not up to the requirements for Division 1 football. After coming 5th in the 2018-19 campaign the club was promoted to Division one west along with the league champions Moreton Rangers.

Ground
The club have played at the Rissington Road ground since 1894. 
The ground was given to the club by local benefactor George Moore.

Honours

Hellenic League
Division Two West champions (1) 2016-17
Gloucestershire Northern Senior League
Division Two champions (2) 1999-00, 2003–04
Witney and District League
Division One champions (1) 2014-15   
Division Four champions (1) 2012-13
Cheltenham Football League
Division One champions (3) 1949-50, 1992–93, 1998–99
Division Two champions (2) 1948-49, 1967–68
Division Three champions (1) 1979-80
Senior Charities Cup Winners (2) 1970-71, 1998–99

References

External links
Official website

Football clubs in England
Football clubs in Gloucestershire
1894 establishments in England
Association football clubs established in 1894
Hellenic Football League